Auto Race, also known as Auto Ride, is an amusement park ride that gave children their first chance to drive a car.  It was conceived and designed by Harry Guy Traver of Traver Engineereing.  This ride features a set of electric cars traveling through a wooden trough-like track lined with metal strips used to carry the electrical current that powers the cars. The last remaining Auto Race is still operating at Kennywood amusement park in West Mifflin, Pennsylvania, as of July, 2021.

Kennywood's Auto Race
Built in 1930, Kennywood's Auto Race is the last of its kind.  Built on the former location of the original racer, it originally featured a series of small hills in the track and jalopy-style cars.

In 1948, the hills were removed due to the collisions caused by cars not making it all the way up when the track was wet and the original cars were redesigned with a more streamlined body.  In 1948, the name was changed to Auto Ride and was changed back to Auto Race in 1996.  Also in the 90's, the cars were painted with racing numbers and the facade of the station was given a new racing motif, painted by local artist Raphael Pantalone and his wife, Kathleen, complete with a replica of the animated neon sign that was added to the front in the 1950s.

Gallery

References

External links

Kennywood
Kennywood by David P. Hahner, Carl O Hughes
Ride Zone

Kennywood
Motorsport in Pennsylvania